The Battle of Pozoblanco took place between 6 March and 16 April 1937, during the Spanish Civil War. The battle saw Republican troops defeat Nationalist attempts to take the town.

References

Pozoblanco
Pozoblanco
1937 in Spain
Pozoblanco
March 1937 events
April 1937 events
History of the province of Córdoba, Spain